Abdul Razak Issahaku (born 12 September 1985), performing as Iwan, is a reggae and dance hall artiste from Ghana, West Africa. Being a product of university of Ghana, Legon, Iwan, also known as "Lyrical Gunshot", pursued Theatre Art and Music and Dance and now holds a Bachelor of Fine Arts.

Iwan was the first person to receive an award in reggae/dancehall in Ghana.

IWAN (which acronym for I Win Always Naturally) is a past student of the University of Ghana  where he dis the Theatre Art, Music and Dance program., is the kid to watch out for.

He was initially signed to Bullhaus Entertainment, the force behind the hiplife duo 5five, and took the music industry by storm with some interesting rhythms from his debut album titled Iwan - My Time. This was 2010.

Otherwise called Abdul Razak Issahaku, Iwan hails from the northern part of Ghana, and belongs to the Dagomba tribe. Born in Accra to Mr. Issahaku Atta and Mrs. Ajara Mamudu, he is the last among three boys and four girls. He describes himself as a humble, quiet, tolerant, hardworking and creative person.

Iwan completed St. John's Junior Sec. School in 2001 and proceeded to the Accra High School where he became the entertainment prefect in his third year. He participated in many school events, and represented the school in competitions outside campus.

He thus took music seriously from the secondary school and started penciling down commercial songs. In his bid to further build his musical career, he took a course in sound engineering.

Iwan  is a very humble artiste and that has caused him to be able to worked with producers from all over the world.

Early life
Lyrical Gunshot started his career by copyrighting others song. He was used to perform songs which was originally composed by his influencers. He performed several educative programmes like Funfair, Variety Shows and inter school events. After performing these roles, Iwan who was then called Popa Razy, started to develop his music career at his teen. He recorded several ground songs which gave him the title Rhyme Dealer. Currently Iwan is on his peace tour 2016.

IWAN is an acronym which stands for "I Win Always Naturally", hails from Kumbungu, the Northern Part of Ghana.

Rising To Popularity

While working as sound engineer, Iwan recorded six songs which include "Party". Later, he parted ways with his management team. Iwan, also known as Lyrical Gunshot, released a hit single "Who's Bad".

Awards
 Reggae Video of the year award (VodFone 4syte Video Awards 2010). 
 Reggae Song of the year (Vodafone Ghana Music Awards 2011) 
 Best Reggae Album (Bass Awards 2013).
 Best songwriter (Bass Awards 2015).

Discography
 My Time (2010)
 12 September (2011)
 Jah (2014)
 Am A Gideon Mixtape (2015)
 Gaskiya (2016)
 Trust In The Lord (2017)
 The Return (2020)
 One Joint Album (2022)

References

External links

IWAN on Facebook

Living people
21st-century Ghanaian male singers
21st-century Ghanaian singers
1985 births
People from Accra